This is a list of fish with common names that are based on the names of other animals. The names listed here may refer to single species, broader taxa (genera, families), or assortments of types. Where names are ambiguous, the various meanings should be listed here.

Named after fish 
The following fish have common names that are based on the names of other fish:

 Carpsucker
 Cod icefish
 Eel cod
 Giant salmon carp
 Loach goby
 Mackerel shark
 Northern trout gudgeon 
 Pike eel
 Pikeminnow
 Pike perch
 Salmon shark
 Salmon smooth-head
 Shark mackerel
 Trout barb
 Trout cod
 Trout-perch
 Trout sweetlips 
 Wrasse bass

Named after reptiles and amphibians 
The following fish have common names that are based on the names of reptiles and amphibians:

 Alligator gar
 Alligatorfish
 Crocodile icefish
 Crocodile shark
 Crocodile toothfish
 Fintail serpent eel
 Frogfish
 Lizardfish
 Salamanderfish
 Sea toad
 Several species within family Ophichthidae known as snake eels, including:
 Armless snake eel
 Finny snake eel
 Ordinary snake eel
 Reptilian snake eel
 Snaggle-toothed snake-eel
 Stargazer snake eel
 Snake mackerel
 Toadfish
 Viperfish, genus Chauliodus, including:
 Dana viperfish
 Pacific viperfish
 Sloane's viperfish

Named after invertebrates 
The following fish have common names that are based on the names of invertebrates:

 Anemonefish
 Butterfly ray
 Butterflyfish
 Coral grouper
 Earthworm eel
 Eastern mosquitofish
 (Western) mosquitofish
 Mussel blenny
 Scorpionfish 
 Seamoth
 Shrimpfish
 Snailfish
 Spiderfish
 Waspfish
 Several species within family Ophichthidae known as worm eels, including:
 Angry worm eel
 Diminutive worm eel
 Leaden worm eel
 Wormfish

Named after birds 
The following fish have common names that are based on the names of birds:

 Avocet snipe eel
 Blackline penguinfish
 Bobtail snipe eel
 Bombay duck (a lizardfish)
 Cockfish
 Cockatoo cichlid
 Cuckoo wrasse
 Eagle ray
 Goosefish
 Hawkfish
 Parrotfish
 Peacock bass
 Peacock gudgeon
 Pelican eel
 Roosterfish
 Sea raven
 Sea robin
 Turkey moray
 Several fish within family Scorpaenidae known as turkeyfish:
 Frillfin turkeyfish
 Hawaiian turkeyfish
 Shortfin turkeyfish
 Twospot turkeyfish

Named after mammals 
The following fish have common names that are based on the names of mammals:

 Bat ray
 Various fish known as batfish:
 Genus Platax, including:
 Orbicular batfish
 Pinnate batfish, dusky batfish, shaded batfish, or red-faced batfish (Platax pinnatus)
 Family Ogcocephalidae, including:
 Red-lipped batfish
 Various fish known as boarfish:
 Family Caproidae
 Several fish in family Pentacerotidae, including:
 Striped boarfish
 Giant boarfish or sowfish
 Longfin boarfish
 Buffalofish
 Bull shark
 Bull trout
 Catfish
 Catshark
 Cowfish
 Cow shark
 Various fish known as dogfish:
 Family Squalidae, the dogfish sharks, including:
 Spiny dogfish
 Several fish in family Scyliorhinidae, including:
 Lesser spotted dogfish
 Greater spotted dogfish or nursehound
 Family Amiidae, the bowfin, including:
 Amia calva
 Dolphinfish, genus Coryphaena, including:
 Common dolphinfish
 Pompano dolphinfish
 Various fish known as elephantfish:
 Freshwater elephantfish
 Marine elephantfish
 Flying fox
 Foxfish
 Goatfish
 Gopher rockfish
 Hog sucker
 Hogchoker
 Hogfish
 Various fish known as horse mackerel, including:
 Atlantic horse mackerel
 Cape horse mackerel
 Greenback horse mackerel
 Japanese horse mackerel
 Yellowtail horse mackerel
 Horsefish
 Houndshark and barbeled houndshark
 Leopard flounder
 Leopard blenny
 Leopard bush fish
 Leopard dace
 Leopard darter
 Leopard eel
 Leopard moray eel
 Leopard whipray
 Lionfish
 Panther danio
 Panther grouper
 Various fish known as pigfish:
 Family Congiopodidae
 Red pigfish
 Ponyfish
 Porcupine ray
 Porcupine river stingray
 Porcupinefish
 Rabbitfish
 Ratfish
 Several species within genus Moxostoma known as redhorses, including:
 Robust redhorse
 Sand tiger shark
 Seahorse
 Smooth-hound
 Splitlevel hogfish
 Squirrelfish
 Stonecat
 Tiger barb
 Tiger shark
 Tiger sorubim
 Various fish known as tigerfish:
 Genus Hydrocynus
 Several species in genus Datnioides, including:
 Finescale tigerfish
 Siamese tigerfish
 Tigerperch
 Weasel shark
 Whale catfish
 Whalefish
 Whale shark
 Wolffish or sea wolves, family Anarhichadidae, including:
 Northern wolffish
 Atlantic wolffish
 Spotted wolffish
 Bering wolffish
 Wolf eel
 Wolf herring
 Zebra bullhead shark
 Zebra danio
 Zebrafish
 Zebra loach
 Zebra moray
 Zebra oto
 Zebra pleco (a catfish)
 Zebra shark
 Zebra tilapia

Named after mythical animals 
The following fish have common names that are based on the names of mythical animals(not listed here is the serpent eel):

 Bigfoot dwarfgoby 
 Chimaera
 Various fish known as dragonfish:
 Several species in family Pegasidae, including:
 Little dragonfish
 Pegasus laternarius, the brick seamoth, also known as the long-tailed dragonfish, pelagic dragonfish, or winged dragonfish
 Family Stomiidae, the barbeled dragonfishes, including:
 Scaly dragonfish
 Black dragonfish
 Broomfin dragonfish
 Deepsea dragonfish
 Longbarb dragonfish
 Longfin dragonfish
 Scaleless dragonfish
 Smalltooth dragonfish
 Threadfin dragonfish
 Threelight dragonfish
 Leafy seadragon
 Sphinx blenny
 Sphinx dragonet 
 Unicorn grenadier
 Various fish known as unicornfish:
 Unicorn crestfish
 Several species in genus Naso, including:
 Whitemargin unicornfish
 Humpback unicornfish
 Short-nosed unicornfish
 Bluetail unicornfish
 Weedy seadragon

Named after two animals 
The following fish have common names that are based on the names of two different animals:

 Avocet snipe eel
 Cockatoo waspfish
 Coral catshark
 Coral hawkfish
 Coral hind
 Coral scorpionfish 
 Coral toadfish
 Crocodile snake eel
 Eel catfish
 Giraffe seahorse
 Hedgehog seahorse
 Leopard catshark
 Leopard chimaera
 Leopard coralgrouper
 Leopard toadfish 
 Oyster toadfish
 Pony toadfish 
 Raccoon butterflyfish
 Striped eel catfish
 Tiger shovelnose catfish
 Tiger snake eel
 Zebra lionfish or zebra turkeyfish (Dendrochirus zebra)
 Zebra seahorse

Named after parts of animals 
The following fish have common names which are based on specific body parts of other animals:

 Bullhead minnow
 Bullhead shark
 Bullhead triplefin
 Various sculpins and catfish known as bullhead
 California sheephead
 Cownose ray
 Duckbill
 Eeltail catfish
 Elephantnose fish
 Foxface
 Harelip sucker
 Horseface unicornfish
 Leopard-spotted goby
 Leopard-spotted swellshark (a catshark)
 Monkeyface eel
 Rattail
 Sheepshead
 Sheepshead porgy
 Sheepshead minnow
 Snakehead

See also 
 List of common fish names

References 

Named after animals
Fish